Enlisted is a free squad-based multiplayer tactical first-person shooter developed by Darkflow Software and published by Gaijin Entertainment. The game is set during World War II and revolves around major battles fought across all fronts of the war. It was an Xbox Series X/S launch title and timed console exclusive. On March 2, 2021, the closed Beta went live on PlayStation 5. On April 8, 2021, the game was released on PC as an open beta test.

Gameplay 
Enlisted is squad-based, with each player controlling an infantry squad or a vehicle's crew. Players control a squad of 3–9 soldiers (represented by a real life division of their respective military, such as the 1st Infantry Division) of varying classes, equipped with class-restricted weapons such as rifles, submachine guns, machine guns, sniper rifles, mortars, anti-tank weapons, or flamethrowers; alternatively, players may control the crew of a tank or a fighter aircraft, at least one of which must always be equipped for use in the menu. Players control one of the soldiers in their squad, and can give orders to or switch between the other AI soldiers in their squad. The player's squads, soldiers, and weaponry can be managed in the main menu, where squads can be equipped and upgraded, soldiers and weapons can be purchased, game modes and campaigns can be switched, and several other aspects of the game can be customized or controlled.

Players battle in large maps based on major World War II battles on the Eastern Front, Western Front, North African Campaign, and the Pacific Theatre. Players are divided into two teams representing the Allies (Red Army, United States Army, United States Marine Corps, British Army, Free French Forces, New Zealand Army, Australian Army) and the Axis (Wehrmacht, Royal Italian Army, Imperial Japanese Army, Romanian Armed Forces). The specific factions used depend on the campaign. The game features six campaigns: Battle of Moscow, Invasion of Normandy, Battle of Berlin, Battle of Stalingrad, Battle of Tunisia, and the Pacific War.

Matchmaking options 

 Squads – Standard default matchmaking, where players spawn with their full squads.
 Lone Fighters – Modified matchmaking, where players do not spawn with their squads; instead the player selects individual soldiers from their squads to spawn as. If a soldier is killed, they will be unavailable for the rest of the match, and another soldier must be selected; to compensate, spawn numbers are increased. Most of the HUD is hidden in this mode. Unlocked at campaign level 3.

Singleplayer tutorial levels for basic gameplay, tanks, planes, and engineers are also available, as is a shooting range containing every weapon in the game.

Game modes 
 Conquest – Both teams fight to control three control points (five in "Battle of Berlin") on a map. Each team is represented by a colored bar that depletes as long as the enemy team has two or more points controlled. The match ends when one team's bar fully depletes.
 Invasion – One team attempts to take a series of five control points on a large map, while the other attempts to defend each point. Each point is played sequentially; if the defenders lose a point, they must retreat to the next point. Attackers are restricted to 1000 respawn tickets (including AI soldiers). Additional tickets can be obtained by capturing control points or by shooting down barrage balloons in certain maps. The match ends when either the attackers run out of tickets or the defenders lose all of their control points.
 Assault – One team must defend a series of control points from the other team. However, two points must be captured at a time to progress, and the points can be captured by either team, allowing the defending team to delay the enemy or push back.
Destruction – One team must defend a series of control points from the other team. However, instead of regular control points that must be captured, the attacking team must plant explosives at each point and destroy them to sabotage the enemy. These explosives can be removed by the enemy, so the attackers must defend their explosives once planted.
Armored Train Escort – One team must escort an armored train through two stations, while the other team must stop them. The respawn zones and objectives shift as the train progresses.
Confrontation – Both teams fight to control a series of control points. Each point is played sequentially, and the front line shifts with each point captured; however, both teams are on the offensive and can recapture lost points. The match ends when a team runs out of tickets or loses all of their control points.

Development 
Gaijin Entertainment and Darkflow Software first announced the game in 2016 as a crowdfunded title. Two campaigns focusing on the Battle of Moscow and the Invasion of Normandy were announced. The game was advertised as a "first person shooter decided by the fans, for the fans" and that "they will have direct input into what we create, including things like campaigns, game modes, even which platforms after PC we will support"; other campaigns would be unlocked if the game's funding goals were met. Funding tiers at the highest levels would allow contributors to choose which campaign would be added next.

The first public play test occurred in April 2020 on PC. In November 2020, ray-traced global illumination and DLSS was added to the game. On May 20, 2021, the Battle of Berlin campaign was partially released in a public beta test.

Release 
At E3 2018, Microsoft confirmed that the game would be released on the Xbox and would be part of the Xbox Game Preview for that year. The first public play test occurred in April 2020 on the PC and in October of the same year, Microsoft announced that Enlisted would be part of the Xbox Series X/S launch lineup and a timed console exclusive. On March 2, 2021, the closed beta went live on PlayStation 5. Nvidia confirmed the game's PC release. On April 8, 2021, the game was released on PC as an open beta test. On October 4, 2021, Enlisted was released on PlayStation 4 and Xbox One, albeit with only the Moscow, Normandy, and Tunisia campaigns. All six campaigns have since been released on all platforms.

Reception 
XboxEra gave Enlisted a 5/10 rating, saying the game's best elements were "mediocre", and its worst elements "truly dreadful". XboxEra praised the gun handling, but criticized the game's uncomfortable controls, generic soundtrack, and poor performance. Heavy criticism was given to the game's slow player progression system, in which each item must be purchased individually for each soldier in each squad, calling the system pay-to-win.

A review by Penny Arcade praised Enlisted, calling it "an absolute blast" and "the best WWII shooter", praising the game's "'Matrix' style encounters where you might die to someone only to come into consciousness in another body".

See also 

 War Thunder
 Day of Infamy
 Post Scriptum
 Hell Let Loose

Notes

References

External links 
 

2021 video games
Massively multiplayer online first-person shooter games
PlayStation 4 games
PlayStation 5 games
Windows games
Xbox One games
Xbox Series X and Series S games
Video games developed in Latvia
World War II video games
Free-to-play video games
Gaijin Entertainment games